"La Primavera" is a song by the German DJ/production team Sash! featuring Patrizia Salvatore. It was released on 16 March 1998 as the lead single from their second album, Life Goes On (1998). The single was a top-five hit in at least six countries, including Ireland, the United Kingdom, and several Nordic countries.

Chart performance
"La Primavera" reached number two in Denmark, Finland, Norway and Scotland. It entered the top 10 in Belgium, Hungary, Iceland, Ireland, Italy and the United Kingdom, as well as on the Eurochart Hot 100, where it peaked at number four. In the UK, it peaked at number three during its first week on the UK Singles Chart, on 29 March 1998, spending two weeks at that position. It was a additionally a top-20 hit in France, Germany, the Netherlands and Switzerland. Outside Europe, "La Primavera" reached number 36 in Australia and number 29 in New Zealand. It earned a gold record in Belgium and Sweden, with sales of 25,000 and 15,000, respectively. In the UK, it earned a silver record, after 200,000 units were sold.

Music video
A music video was made for "La Primavera", directed by Oliver Sommer. Sommer also directed the music videos for "Encore une fois", "Stay" and "Ecuador".

Track listings

German maxi-CD single
 "La Primavera" (original radio/video edit) – 3:09
 "La Primavera" (U.K. radio edit) – 3:35
 "La Primavera" (original 12-inch) – 5:42
 "La Primavera" (DJ Jam & De Leon remix) – 6:03
 "La Primavera" (Blank & Jones club mix) – 8:18
 "La Primavera" (Ric Moraine remix) – 6:11
 "La Primavera" (Indi-Cut-Tiv)	– 2:30

European CD single
 "La Primavera" (original radio edit) – 3:09
 "La Primavera" (Ric Moraine edit) – 3:14

UK cassette single
 "La Primavera" (radio edit) – 3:35
 "La Primavera" (Magic Alec's 'Break for Love' mix) – 7:22

UK CD1
 "La Primavera" (radio edit) – 3:35
 "La Primavera" (DJ JamX & De Leon remix) – 6:03
 "La Primavera" (Magic Alec's 'As the Wind Blows' mix) – 6:47
 "La Primavera" (Ric Moraine mix) – 6:11
 "La Primavera" (Blank & Jones club mix) – 8:19

UK CD2
 "La Primavera" (radio edit) – 3:35
 "La Primavera" (original 12-inch) – 5:42
 "La Primavera" (Magic Alec's 'Break for Love' mix) – 7:22
 "The Megamix" (radio edit) – 3:39

Credits
 Producer – Sash!, Tokapi 
 Vocals [Uncredited] – Patrizia Salvatore 
 Written-By – Ralf Kappmeier, Sascha Lappessen, Thomas Alisson

Charts

Weekly charts

Year-end charts

Certifications

References

1998 singles
1998 songs
Multiply Records singles
Music videos directed by Oliver Sommer
Sash! songs
Trance songs